Valeria Lieszkowszky is a Hungarian sprint canoer who competed in the mid-1950s. She won a silver medal in the K-2 500 m event at the 1954 ICF Canoe Sprint World Championships in Mâcon.

References

Hungarian female canoeists
Living people
Year of birth missing (living people)
ICF Canoe Sprint World Championships medalists in kayak
20th-century Hungarian women